Wathiq Aswad (born 1 July 1957) is an Iraqi former footballer. He competed in the men's tournament at the 1980 Summer Olympics.

References

External links
 
 

1957 births
Living people
Iraqi footballers
Iraq international footballers
Olympic footballers of Iraq
Footballers at the 1980 Summer Olympics
Place of birth missing (living people)
Association football defenders
Asian Games medalists in football
Asian Games gold medalists for Iraq
Footballers at the 1982 Asian Games
Medalists at the 1982 Asian Games
Al-Talaba SC players
Iraqi football managers